Gregory Fitzgerald (born 28 November 1976) is an Australian wrestler. He competed in the men's freestyle 52 kg at the 1996 Summer Olympics.

References

1976 births
Living people
Australian male sport wrestlers
Olympic wrestlers of Australia
Wrestlers at the 1996 Summer Olympics
Sportspeople from Wollongong